Losacino is a municipality located in the province of Zamora, Castile and León, Spain. According to the 2004 census (INE), the municipality has a population of 306 inhabitants.

Town hall
Losacino is home to the town hall of 4 towns:
Muga de Alba (144 inhabitants, INE 2020).
Losacino (43 inhabitants, INE 2020).
Vide de Alba (20 inhabitants, INE 2020).
Castillo de Alba (3 inhabitants, INE 2020).

References

Municipalities of the Province of Zamora